This is a list of international trips made by Maia Sandu, the 6th President of Moldova and the former Prime Minister of Moldova (serving in June – November 2019).

International trips as Prime Minister (2019)

As President
Since she took office on 24 December 2020 she has made:

 One visit to Italy, Georgia, Netherlands, Lithuania, United Kingdom, Czech Republic, Tunisia and Japan.
 Two visits to Poland, Greece, Austria and Switzerland. 
 Three visits to Ukraine, Belgium, United States and Poland. 
 Four visits to Germany. 
 Five visits to France and Romania.

2021

2022

2023

References

Sandu
Politics of Moldova
Sandu
Diplomatic visits by heads of state